Ahmad bin Muhammad al-Muhsini (1744 – 1831) was an Eastern Arabian-Iranian Ja'fari jurist and writer. He was born in Medina during his father's travels and grew up in Al-Ahsa, Eastern Arabia. He went to Iraq to complete his religious education and studied with Ja'far Kashif al-Ghita', Muhammad Husayn al-Araji al-Kazemi, M.M Bahr al-Ulum and the others. Then he settled with his family in Dowraq as a Shaykhi mujtahid, where he worked as a religious and spiritual leader for the Twelver Shiites in the region of Arabistan in the early years of Qajar Iran, from 1799 until his death during 1830s plague epidemic. Al-Muhsini left behind many handwritten books, booklets, epistles and poetry.

Biography  
His full nasab is: Jamal al-Din Ahmad bin Muhammad bin Muhsin bin Ali bin Muhammad bin Ahmad bin Muhammad bin Hussein bin Ahmad bin Muhammad bin Khamis bin Saif, Al-Rab’i Al-Ahsa’i Al-Quraini. He was the first person who has been called "Al-Muhsini" in his family, a family name derived from the grandfather's first name. He was born in Medina in 1157 AH / 1744 AD during his father's travel to Hejaz. His father, Muhammad, was residing in the village of Al-Qurain in the northern of Al-Ahsa. Under his care, he lived and raised in Al-Ahsa, and his first teacher was his father who taught him initial lessons, then he became an student  of Hussain Al-Asfoor.  He moved to Ottoman Iraq. There, he completed his religious educations in Najaf and Karbala under its scholars, such as: Ja'far Kashif al-Ghita', Muhammad Husayn al-Araji al-Kazemi, M.M Bahr al-Ulum and he had ijazah from these. He returned to his hometown in 1795. In 1799, he left Al-Ahsa to and headed towards Arabistan, and settled  in the city of Dowraq, where he worked as a religious leader for the Twelver Shiites in the region of Arabistan in the early years of Qajar Iran.   He collected most of the books of the past ulema, and made a great library containing valuable books that helped him to write more than fourteen works. 
 
Ahmad al-Muhsini died of the plague in Dowraq in 1247 AH / 1831 AD, at the age of 86 years. His body was buried in a special cemetery that he prepared for himself, next to the mosque where he was the imam.

Poetry 
Before he became a poet, he was attracted by fiqh, literature then poetry. He left behind a collection of handwritten poetry that exceeds two thousand verses. Most of his poems are dated between 1808 and 1813, while the rest of the poems are undated, which indicates that he started writing poetry late in life. His poetry is dominated by love and loyalty to the family of the Prophet Muhammad from his Twelver Shia outlook. The dictionary Al-Babtain of Contemporary Arab Poets described his poetry as follows:

Works 
Al-Muhsini wrote many annonations (ḥāshiyah) and explanations (Sharḥ) on :Bihar al-Anwar by Mohammad-Baqer Majlesi,  Al-Tanqīḥ al-rāʼiʻ by Migdad al-Syiuri, Al-Rawḍah al-Bahiyah and  Al-mukhtaṣar al-nāfiʻ by Muhaqqiq al-Hilli, Qawa'id al-ahkam by Al-Hilli, Madarak al-Ahkam by Muhammad al-Amili, Masalik al-Afham by Zayn al-Din al-Amili and Mafātīḩ al-sharā'i' by Mohsen Fayz Kashani. Other works by Al-Muhsini including:

References 

1744 births
1831 deaths
19th-century Saudi Arabian poets
19th-century Iranian poets
Iranian Arabic-language poets
Iranian Arab Islamic scholars
19th-century deaths from plague (disease)
Iranian religious writers
Saudi Arabian religious writers
People from Medina
18th-century Islamic religious leaders
18th-century Muslim scholars of Islam
19th-century Muslim scholars of Islam
Iranian book and manuscript collectors
Shaykhis
Saudi Arabian book and manuscript collectors